"I'm a Boss" is a hip hop song by American rapper Meek Mill, released on May 17, 2011, as the fifth single from the Maybach Music Group compilation album, Self Made Vol. 1. The song is also included on Meek Mill's mixtape, Dreamchasers.
The song features MMG label boss and fellow rapper Rick Ross and was produced by Jahlil Beats.
An instrumental version was featured on the soundtrack of NBA 2K13.

Music video 
The music video was released on August 31, 2011, and was directed by Benny Boom.
Ace Hood, Young Chris and Wale make cameo appearances.

Remix 
On November 9, 2011, the official remix was released featuring T.I., Birdman, Lil Wayne, DJ Khaled, Rick Ross and Swizz Beatz.
The song has peaked at #51 on the Billboard Hot 100.

Track listing
 Digital single

Charts

Weekly charts

Certifications

References

2010 songs
2011 singles
Meek Mill songs
Rick Ross songs
Maybach Music Group singles
Songs written by Rick Ross
Song recordings produced by Jahlil Beats
Music videos directed by Benny Boom
Songs written by Meek Mill
Songs written by Jahlil Beats